Heinrich Petersen may refer to:

 Heinrich Petersen-Angeln (1850–1906), German painter
 Heinrich Petersen (naval officer) (1902–1963), German U-boat machinist in World War II
 Heinrich Petersen (SS officer) (1904–1945),  Standartenführer in the Waffen-SS during World War II